The Zavodskyi District is one of seven administrative urban districts (raions) of the city of Zaporizhzhia, located in southern Ukraine. Its population was 60,390 in the 2001 Ukrainian Census, and 52,191 .

Geography
The Zavodskyi District is named in such a way due to the fact that a large amount of the city's factories are located within its boundaries. The district is located in the northern portion of the city, on the left-bank of the Dnipro River.

History
On 23 May 1969, the Zavodskyi District was established out of a portion of the Ordzhonikidzevskyi District by a decree of the Presidium of the Verkhovna Rada of the Ukrainian Soviet Socialist Republic (No.1901-ІХ).

Gallery

References

External links
 

Urban districts of Zaporizhzhia
States and territories established in 1969
1969 establishments in Ukraine